Nordfyns Højskole is a folk high school based on the philosophy of N. F. S. Grundtvig. Nordfyns Folkehøjskole is situated in the village of Harritslev near the town of Bogense in Denmark.

Nordfyns Folkehøjskole is part of the nonformal educational system in Denmark. Nonformal education is without marks and exams.

Nordfyns Højskole history starts with the Japanese Tadao Chiba who came to Denmark more than 50 years ago. Since then they have been an international folk high school inviting students from all over the world to study there. In the multicultural environment students meet a variety of people, life styles, hopes and dreams for the future. All students strive for creating a better life in a better world.

Nordfyns Højskole offer subjects and a learning community that will produce new ways of living personally and in the "global village". Here you can learn with your heart, your brain, your hands and your body. This holistic learning is qualifying you for the future – you shape your future and "you will be the change"

References 

Schools in Denmark